Willem Wauters (born 10 November 1989) is a Belgian former professional road cyclist. He rode in the 2013 Giro d'Italia, where he finished in 158th place.

Major results
2010
 1st Stage 3 Triptyque Ardennais
2011
 1st Stage 4 Vuelta a la Comunidad de Madrid U23
 2nd Grote Prijs Stad Zottegem
2014
 5th Paris–Mantes-en-Yvelines

References

External links

1989 births
Living people
Belgian male cyclists
Sportspeople from Ghent
Cyclists from East Flanders